WEZF (92.9 MHz, "Star 92.9") is a commercial FM radio station located in Burlington, Vermont. The station airs a hot adult contemporary radio format and is owned and operated by Vox AM/FM.  WEZF has studios and offices on Hegeman Avenue in Colchester and its transmitter is on top of Vermont's highest mountaintop, Mount Mansfield, using an omnidirectional antenna.  WEZF carries the syndicated Delilah evening show from Premiere Networks.  All weekday air shifts are either hosted or co-hosted by women.  From mid-November to December 25 each year, WEZF switches to an all-Christmas music format.

WEZF is the only full-powered commercial Class C radio station in Vermont.  WEZF transmits with an effective radiated power (ERP) of 46,000 watts at a height above average terrain (HAAT) of 2,717 feet.

History

1969-1999
Early years: beautiful music and soft adult contemporary

On July 19, 1969, WEZF first signed on as WVNY, owned by Vermont New York Broadcasting, Inc.  That call sign was shared with ABC-TV network affiliate WVNY-TV 22, which signed on a year before its FM counterpart. WEZF was unusual in that it was originally launched as an offshoot of a TV station and never had a companion AM station. This situation made WEZF the first FM station in Vermont without an AM counterpart.

WVNY originally had a beautiful music format, playing sets of soft instrumental music with limited disc jockey patter.  In 1974, to reflect the FM station's easy listening format, the callsigns for both stations were changed to WEZF and WEZF-TV.  In 1982, the two stations were sold to Champlain Communications Corporation.  The TV station returned to its original WVNY call sign, while the FM station moved to a soft adult contemporary sound as "93 WEZF."  In 1995, the station switched to a mainstream AC format and rebranded as "92.9 WEZF."

1999-2008
The Clear Channel era and early "Star 92.9" era

In 1999, the station turned up the tempo again, now as a hot AC outlet, and was rebranded as Star 92.9.  In August, 2000, WEZF was acquired by Clear Channel Communications, the forerunner to today's iHeartMedia, Inc.  By 2003, the station reverted to Adult Contemporary after previous AC station 103.3 The Lake (now adult hits WWMP) flipped formats.  In addition, Christmas music began airing on the station from mid-November to December 25, a tradition that has remained.

2008-2010
Vox takeover

WEZF still broadcasts from historic Fort Ethan Allen in Colchester, Vermont where it had been co-located with Channel 22 WVNY-TV.  (WVNY-TV, now owned by Nexstar, moved to other studios in Colchester.)  In 2007, Clear Channel, America's largest owner of radio stations, announced it would sell off hundreds of its stations in smaller markets.  WEZF, along with sister stations WCPV, WXZO, WEAV, WVTK, WXZO, WCVR-FM, and WTSJ, were all involved in a sale to locally owned Vox Communications. One of the current principal owners in Vox Communications originally launched both WCPV in late 1994, and after that the radio station now known as WXZO.

In July 2008, Vox Communications took control of WEZF and its sister stations.

2010-2012
End of "Feel Good Flashback Weekends," morning show adjustment and moving towards a hot adult contemporary direction

By September 2010, a few months after its classic hits-formatted Feel Good Flashback Weekend show was dropped and as sister station WXZO become Top 40 "Planet 96.7," WEZF moved back to Hot AC.  Management explained the Feel Good Flashback Weekend show was discontinued due to rival WWMP returning to adult hits while Star 92.9 moved to a younger sound.

By September 2011, WEZF was moved to the Nielsen BDS hot adult contemporary panel, but the station was still listed as adult contemporary by Mediabase reports.

In Fall 2011, WEZF began pursuing listeners and advertisers in the Montreal radio market, taking advantage of 92.5 CFQR-FM's change in format, becoming rhythmic AC CKBE-FM, "92-5 The Beat."  That left Montreal without an English-language AC station, a void that WEZF wanted to fill.  Martz Communications Group, which handles advertising sales for WEZF, orchestrated the effort.

2012-present
Morning show change and return to hot adult contemporary

The hosts of the morning show changed in late 2011.  As of March 2012, WEZF was switched to the hot adult contemporary panel per Mediabase reports, its second run in the hot AC format.  More than a week after the station flipped formats to hot AC, the station made schedule readjustments, moving Tara to drive time, while bringing a new morning show with hosts Tim & Mary.  The move left former sister station 92.1 WVTK as the only AC in the Burlington radio market.  The adult contemporary format dropped by WEZF was later picked up by WIER 102.3, which flipped from active rock in March 2012.  However, that station is now Hot AC WIXM.

References

External links
Star 92.9 WEZF official website

EZF
Hot adult contemporary radio stations in the United States
Radio stations established in 1969
1969 establishments in Vermont